Konstantinos Ndubuisi "Kostas" Antetokounmpo (born Adetokunbo November 20, 1997) is a Greek-Nigerian professional basketball player for Fenerbahçe of the Turkish BSL and the EuroLeague. He played college basketball for the Dayton Flyers.

Antetokounmpo was drafted 60th overall by the Philadelphia 76ers in the 2018 NBA draft, and his draft rights were then traded to the Dallas Mavericks. He won an NBA championship with the Los Angeles Lakers in 2020.

His brothers Giannis, Thanasis and Alex are also professional basketball players.

Kostas, along with hockey player Filip Forsberg and three of his brothers, Giannis, Thanasis and Alex, were announced as joining the Nashville SC ownership group in the MLS.

Early life and family
Antetokounmpo was born in Sepolia in Athens, Greece. His parents were immigrants from Nigeria. His late father, Charles, was a former Nigerian soccer player, while his mother, Veronica, was a high jumper. Charles died in September 2017, at age 54. His parents are from different Nigerian ethnic groups; Charles was Yoruba, and Veronica is Igbo.

He has a Nigerian passport, granted to him in June 2013 so that he could gain a visa, and be allowed to legally enter the United States. He officially became a full Greek citizen in 2016.

He is the younger brother of basketball players Giannis and Thanasis and the older brother of Alex. His oldest brother, Francis, is also a professional association football player.

He began playing basketball with the junior teams of Filathlitikos, in Athens.

High school career
After his older brother Giannis was drafted by the Milwaukee Bucks in the 2013 NBA draft, Antetokounmpo, along with his parents and his younger brother, Alexis, moved to Milwaukee. He attended Dominican High School in Whitefish Bay, Wisconsin, where he played high school basketball during his junior and senior years. As a senior, he led his team to a state championship.

College career
After high school, Antetokounmpo moved on to play college basketball at the University of Dayton. In the 2016–17 season, his first with the Flyers, he was red-shirted, after being ruled a "partial qualifier", due to having spent his first two years of high school in Greece. He debuted in the 2017–18 season, averaging 5.2 points, 2.9 rebounds, 0.4 assists, 0.2 steals, and 1.1 blocks per game, in 15.1 minutes per game.

Professional career

Dallas Mavericks (2018–2019)
On March 22, 2018, Antetokounmpo declared for the 2018 NBA draft. On May 4, 2018, Antetokounmpo was one of a record-high 69 players to enter the NBA Draft Combine. Antetokounmpo was projected to be a second round selection, similar to his older brother Thanasis, due to his lack of notable progress in his redshirt freshman college season. He was the last pick of the 2018 NBA draft, selected by the Philadelphia 76ers, and then immediately traded to the Dallas Mavericks. Antetokounmpo signed a two-way contract on July 13. Throughout the contract, he would split his playing time between the Mavericks and their NBA G League affiliate, the Texas Legends. He made his NBA debut on March 20, 2019 in a 118–126 loss to the Portland Trail Blazers.

On July 19, 2019, Antetokounmpo was waived by the Mavericks.

Los Angeles Lakers (2019–2021)
Antetokounmpo was claimed off waivers by the Los Angeles Lakers on July 22, 2019. He played 5 games throughout the season on a two-way contract and scored a career high 7 points in the team's 136–122 loss to the Sacramento Kings on August 13, 2020. Antetokounmpo won his first championship after the Lakers defeated the Miami Heat in six games. He became the first Greek-born player to win an NBA championship; one season later, his brothers Giannis and Thanasis won their own championships as teammates on the Milwaukee Bucks.

On November 26, 2020, Antetokounmpo re-signed with the Lakers to a two-way contract.

ASVEL (2021–2022)
On July 16, 2021, Antetokounmpo signed with LDLC ASVEL of the French Betclic Élite and the EuroLeague.

Windy City Bulls (2022)
On October 14, 2022, Antetokounmpo signed a two-way contract with the Chicago Bulls. He was waived by the Bulls on December 16, 2022, without appearing in a game for the team at the NBA level.

Fenerbahçe (2022–present)
On December 19, 2022, Antetokounmpo signed with Fenerbahçe Beko of the Turkish Basketball Super League (BSL).

National team career
Antetokounmpo played with the junior Greek Under-20 national team. He played at the 2016 FIBA Europe Under-20 Championship Division B, where he won a bronze medal. During the tournament, he averaged 1.3 points, 1.8 rebounds, and 0.3 assists per game.

Career statistics

NBA

Regular season

|-
| style="text-align:left;"|
| style="text-align:left;"|Dallas
| 2 || 0 || 5.5 || .000 ||  || .500|| .5 || .0 || 1.0 || .0 || 1.0
|-
| style="text-align:left; background:#afe6ba;"|
| style="text-align:left;"|L.A. Lakers
| 5 || 0 || 4.0 || 1.000 ||  || .500 || .6 || .4 || .0 || .0 || 1.4
|-
| style="text-align:left;"|
| style="text-align:left;"|L.A. Lakers
| 15 || 0|| 3.7 || .300 ||  || .462 || 1.3 || .1 || .1 || .3 || .8
|- class="sortbottom"
| style="text-align:center;" colspan="2"|Career
| 22 || 0 || 4.0 || .375 ||  || .474 || 1.0 || .1 || .2 || .2 || 1.0

College

|-
| style="text-align:left;"|2017–18
| style="text-align:left;"|Dayton
| 29 || 6 || 21.1 || .574 || .133 || .516 || 2.9 || .4 || .2 || 1.1 || 5.2

EuroLeague

|-
| style="text-align:left;"| 2021–22
| style="text-align:left;"| ASVEL Basket
| 26 || 3 || 13:08||.718||.400||.548||2.6||.3||.5||.7||5.8||7.1
|-
| style="text-align:left;"| 2022–23
| style="text-align:left;"| Fenerbahçe Beko
| 8 || 4 || 10:45 || .824 || 0 || .588 || 1.2 || .8 || .4 || .1 || 4.8 || 4.5
|- class="sortbottom"
| style="text-align:center;" colspan=2 | Career
| 26 || 3 || 13:08||.718||.400||.548||2.6||.3||.5||.7||5.8||7.1

References

External links
 
 Kostas Antetokounmpo  at basket.gr 
 
 Kostas Antetokounmpo at euroleague.net
 Kostas Antetokounmpo at daytonflyers.com
 Kostas Antetokounmpo at proballers.com

1997 births
Living people
Antetokounmpo family
ASVEL Basket players
Fenerbahçe men's basketball players
Basketball players from Athens
Centers (basketball)
Citizens of Nigeria through descent
Dallas Mavericks players
Dayton Flyers men's basketball players
Greek expatriate basketball people in France
Greek expatriate basketball people in the United States
Greek men's basketball players
Greek people of Igbo descent
Greek people of Nigerian descent
Greek people of Yoruba descent
Greek emigrants to the United States
Igbo sportspeople
Los Angeles Lakers players
National Basketball Association players from Greece
Naturalized citizens of Greece
Nigerian expatriate basketball people in France
Nigerian expatriate basketball people in the United States
Philadelphia 76ers draft picks
Power forwards (basketball)
South Bay Lakers players
Texas Legends players
Yoruba sportspeople